Justin Cicolella (born 12 September 1978) is an Australian rules footballer who played for the Adelaide Crows in the Australian Football League in 2000. He played with the Woodville-West Torrens Football Club (the Eagles) in the South Australian National Football League and was acting captain of their 2006 premiership side, as well as a member of the 2011 premiership side.

References

External links
 
 

Adelaide Football Club players
Woodville-West Torrens Football Club players
Australian rules footballers from South Australia
1978 births
Living people